Schooley's Mountain is an unincorporated community located within Washington Township in Morris County, New Jersey. Named for the Schooley family who owned a considerable amount of land there in the 1790s, the community is on Schooley's Mountain, a mountain with an elevation of about  directly north of Long Valley. It contains many housing developments and Schooley's Mountain Park, a recreational area with an overlook, a waterfall, and numerous hiking paths, as well as Lake George. In its past, Schooley's Mountain was a resort and an estate.

The Lenni Lenape Native Americans called it home.  The Vanderbilts were among the numerous New York City socialites who trekked to the mountain for its restorative waters.  The rich chalybeate-infused waters were thought to improve health, and detoxify the system.

The park was acquired by the Morris County Parks Commission in 1968 and opened to the public in 1974.

Historic district
The Schooley's Mountain Historic District encompassing the community was added to the National Register of Historic Places in 1991 for its significance in architecture, entertainment/recreation, and health/medicine.

References

External links
 
 Schooley's Mountain County Park
 Schooley's Mountain Fire Protection Association

Washington Township, Morris County, New Jersey
Unincorporated communities in Morris County, New Jersey
Unincorporated communities in New Jersey